Aker may refer to:

Places
 Aker, Norway, a geographic area in Oslo and a former municipality in Norway
 Vestre Aker, a district of Oslo within former Aker municipality
 Nordre Aker, a district of Oslo within former Aker municipality
 Aker Brygge, a business and entertainment area in central Oslo

Organisations and structures
 Aker ASA, a company based in Oslo, Norway, including its subsidiaries
 Aker Solutions, an engineering company (formerly Aker Kværner)
 Aker American Shipping, a bareboat company with Aker Philadelphia Shipyard
 Aker Drilling, an oil rig company
 Aker Floating Production, a company engaged in ship based petroleum production
 Aker Seafoods, a seafood company
 Aker BioMarine, a krill harvest and processing company
 Akers mekaniske Verksted, a former shipyard in Oslo
 Aker stadion in Molde, Norway
 Aker University Hospital, a primary hospital in eastern Oslo
 Aker Yards, a European ship yard group
 Old Aker Church, a church in Oslo

Other uses
 Aker (name), a surname
 Aker (angel), mentioned only in the Greek Apocalypse of Ezra
 Aker (deity), a god in ancient Egyptian mythology
 Jason Akermanis, former Australian rules footballer

See also 
 Acre (disambiguation)
 Åker (disambiguation)
 Akershus, Norwegian county surrounding Oslo
 Akershus Fortress, castle in central Oslo
Acker, a surname
Ackers